Lednica is a village and municipality in Púchov District in the Trenčín Region of north-western Slovakia.

History
In historical records the village was first mentioned in 1259.

Geography
The municipality lies at an altitude of 398 metres and covers an area of 22.654 km². It has a population of about 1,020 people.

Lednica Castle

References

External links
 
 

Villages and municipalities in Púchov District